There are at least 164 named lakes and reservoirs in Park County, Montana.

Lakes
 Aldridge Lake, el. 
 Alpine Lake, el. 
 Anvil Lake, el. 
 Aquarius Lake, el. 
 Arrastra Lake, el. 
 Astral Lake, el. 
 Basin Lake, el. 
 Beauty Lake, el. 
 Blacktail Lake, el. 
 Bob Lake, el. 
 Boulder Lakes, el. 
 Bridge Lake, el. 
 Broadwater Lake, el. 
 Campfire Lake, el. 
 Carpenter Lake, el. 
 Casey Lake, el. 
 Castle Lake, el. 
 Cave Lake, el. 
 Cavity Lake, el. 
 Charlie White Lake, el. 
 Cliff Lake, el. 
 Colley Lake, el. 
 Companion Lake, el. 
 Corner Lake, el. 
 Cottonwood Lake, el. 
 Courthouse Lake, el. 
 Crag Lake, el. 
 Crescent Lake, el. 
 Crevice Lake, el. 
 Crystal Lake, el. 
 Curl Lake, el. 
 Cutler Lake, el. , surface area: 
 Dailey Lake, el. , surface area: 
 Dead Horse Lakes, el. 
 Diamond Lake, el. 
 Dick Lake, el. 
 Dollar Lake, el. 
 Druckmiller Lake, el. 
 Elbow Lake, el. 
 Elk Lake, el. 
 Fawn Lake, el. 
 Ferrell Lake, el. 
 Finger Lake, el. 
 Fire Lake, el. 
 Fish Lake, el. 
 Fitzpatrick Lake, el. 
 Five Lakes, el. 
 Fizzle Lake, el. 
 Fly Lake, el. 
 Fox Lake, el. 
 Fulcrum Lake, el. 
 Gate Lake, el. 
 George Lake, el. 
 Glacier Green Lake, el. 
 Glacier Lake, el. 
 Goose Lake, el. 
 Granite Lake, el. 
 Grasshopper Lakes, el. 
 Green Lake, el. 
 Green Lake, el. 
 Hidden Lake, el. 
 High Lake, el. 
 Hilltop Lake, el. 
 Horseshoe Lake, el. 
 Horseshoe Lake, el. 
 Huckleberry Lake, el. 
 Imelda Lake, el. 
 Incisor Lake, el. 
 Jeff Lake, el. 
 Jewel Lake, el. 
 Kaufman Lake, el. 
 Kersey Lake, el. 
 Knott Lake, el. 
 La Velle Lake, el. 
 Lady of the Lake, el. 
 Lake Abundance, el. 
 Lake Aries, el. 
 Lake McKnight, el. 
 Lake of the Woods, el. 
 Leaky Raft Lake, el. 
 Leech Lake, el. 
 Lillis Lake, el. 
 Little Goose Lake, el. 
 Little Green Lake, el. 
 Little Joe Lake, el. 
 Little Molar Lake, el. 
 Lone Elk Lake, el. 
 Lone Lake, el. 
 Lone Lake, el. 
 Lonesome Pond, el. 
 Long Lake, el. 
 Looking Glass Lake, el. 
 Lost Lakes, el. 
 Lower Aero Lake, el. 
 Margaret Lake, el. 
 Marsh Lake, el. 
 Merrell Lake, el. 
 Moccasin Lake, el. 
 Molar Lake, el. 
 Moose Lake, el. 
 Mud Lake, el. 
 Mud Lake, el. 
 Mud Lake, el. 
 Mutt Lake, el. 
 No Bones Lake, el. 
 Nurses Lakes, el. 
 Oasis Lakes, el. 
 Ovis Lake, el. 
 Paddle Lake, el. 
 Panhandle Lake, el. 
 Peanut Lake, el. 
 Pear Lake, el. 
 Pine Creek Lake, el. 
 Pneumonia Lake, el. 
 Production Lake, el. 
 Rainbow Lake, el. 
 Recroitment Lake, el. 
 Redfield Lake, el. 
 Reed Lake, el. 
 Rock Island Lake, el. 
 Rock Lake, el. 
 Rough Lake, el. 
 Round Lake, el. 
 Sedge Lake, el. 
 Sedge Lake, el. 
 Shelf Lake, el. 
 Shelter Lake, el. 
 Shooting Star Lake, el. 
 Silver Lake, el. 
 Skull Lake, el. 
 Sky Top Lakes, el. 
 Slide Lake, el. 
 Smeller Lake, el. 
 Snow Lake, el. 
 Sodalite Lake, el. 
 Sourdough Lake, el. 
 Spider Lake, el. 
 Splinter Lake, el. 
 Sportsman Lake, el. 
 Star Dust Lake, el. 
 Star Lake, el. 
 Stash Lake, el. 
 Stepping Stone Lake, el. 
 Sunlight Lake, el. 
 Surprise Lake, el. 
 Swamp Lake, el. 
 Thompson Lake (Park County, Montana), el. 
 Trapper Lake, el. 
 Twin Lakes, el. 
 Twin Lakes, el. 
 Twin Lakes, el. 
 Upper Aero Lake, el. 
 Vernon Lake, el. 
 Wall Lake, el. 
 Washtub Lake, el. 
 Weasel Lake, el. 
 West Boulder Lake, el. 
 Wiedy Lake, el. 
 Wolf Lakes, el. 
 Wolf Voice Lake, el. 
 Wrong Lake, el. 
 Yankee Jim Lake, el. 
 Zimmer Lake, el.

Reservoirs
 Cottonwood Reservoir, el.

See also
 List of lakes in Montana

Notes

Bodies of water of Park County, Montana
Park